Protein unc-13 homolog B is a protein that in humans is encoded by the UNC13B gene.

Function 

This gene is expressed in the kidney cortical epithelial cells and is upregulated by hyperglycemia. The encoded protein shares a high level of similarity to the rat homolog, and contains 3 C2 domains and a diacylglycerol-binding C1 domain. Hyperglycemia increases the levels of diacylglycerol, which has been shown to induce apoptosis in cells transfected with this gene and thus contribute to the renal cell complications of hyperglycemia. Studies in other species also indicate a role for this protein in the priming step of synaptic vesicle exocytosis.

Interactions 

UNC13B has been shown to interact with:
 DOC2A,
 RIMS1, 
 SPTBN2, 
 STX1A,  and
 STX1B.

References

Further reading